2019 Netball World Cup squads. This is a list of squads selected for the 2019 Netball World Cup.

Group A

Caitlin Bassett (Captain), April Brandley, Kelsey Browne, Courtney Bruce, Paige Hadley, Sarah Klau, Jamie-Lee Price, Caitlin Thwaites, Gretel Tippett, Liz Watson (vice-captain), Jo Weston, Stephanie Wood.



Chathurangi Jayasooriya, Dharshika Abeywickrama, Gayani Dissanayake, Tharjini Sivalingam, Thilini Waththegedara, Gayanjali Amarawansa, Hasitha Mendis, Deepika Darshani, Dulangi Wannithilake, Dulanga Dhananji, Elilenthini Sethukavalar, Nauchalee Rajapakse

Adelaide Muskwe, Claris Kwaramba, Felisitus Kwangwa, Joice Takaidza, Ndaizivei Madzikangava, Patricia Mauladi, Pauline Jani, Perpetua Siyachitema (Captain), Rudo Karume, Sharon Bwanali, Sharleen Makusha, Ursula Ndlovu

Group B

Amanda Knight, Brianna Holder, Damisha Croney, Latonia Blackman, Rhe-Ann Niles-Mapp, Rieah Holder, Samantha Browne, Sheniqua Thomas, Shonica Wharton, Shonette Azore-Bruce, Shonte Seale, Tonisha Rock-Yaw

Thandie Galleta, Joanna Kachilika, Alinafe Kamwala, Bridget Kumwenda, Caroline Mtukule, Loreen Ngwira, Sindi Simtowe, Jane Chimaliro, Takondwa Lwazi, Joyce Mvula, Grace Mwafulirwa, Towera Vinkhumbo

Maria Folau,
Laura Langman (Captain),
Ameliaranne Ekenasio,
Gina Crampton,
Bailey Mes,
Casey Kopua,
Jane Watson,
Shannon Saunders,
Karin Burger,
Phoenix Karaka,
Katrina Rore,
Te Paea Selby-Rickit

Pei Shan Lee, Charmaine Soh, Xinyi Tan, Kai Wei Toh, Carmen Goh, Kimberly Lim, Shawallah Rashid, Shuyi Kwok, Aqilah Andin, Melody Teo, Sindhu Nair, Joanna Toh

Group C

Kaitlyn Fisher, Episake Kahatoka, Alisi Galo, Kelera Nawai, Lydia Panapasa, Unaisi Rauluni, Aliti Toribau, Adi Vakaoca Bolakoro, Ema Mualuvu, Asilika Sevutia, Matila Vocea, Laisani Waqa

Romelda Aiken, Jhanielle Fowler-Reid (Captain), Vangelee Williams, Jodi-Ann Ward, Stacian Facey, Shanice Beckford, Adean Thomas, Nicole Dixon, Khadijah Williams, Kadie-Ann Dehaney, Shamera Sterling, Rebekah Robinson

Lenize Potgieter, Erin Burger, Maryka Holtzhausen, Renske Stoltz, Ine-Marí Venter, Izette Griesel, Khanyisa Chawane, Bongiwe Msomi (Captain), Shadine van der Merwe, Karla Pretorius, Phumza Maweni, Zanele Vimbela

Jameela McCarthy, Tahirah Hollingsworth, Kalifa MCollin, Samantha Wallace, Daystar Swift, Shaquanda Queena, Onella Jack-Hill, Aniecia Baptiste, Rhonda John-Davis, Shantel Seemungal, Shernece Seemungal, Candice Guerero

Group D



Ann Helen Nu'uali'itia, Ariana Luamanu, Toa Tanimo, Brooke Amber Williams, Eseta Autagavaia, Gene Nafanua Solia-Gibb, Lenora Misa, Rachel Rasmussen, Sanita To’o, Afi Lafaiali’i-Sapolu, Soli Ropati, Tee Salanoa



Peace Proscovia (Captain), Mary Cholhok Nuba, Lilian Ajio, Jesca Achan, Ruth Meeme, Betty Kizza, Racheal Nanyonga, Sylvia Nanyonga, Joan Nampungu, Stella Oyella, Stella Nanfuka, Muhayimina Namuwaya

References

 
World Cup